Lafayette High School is a public high school in Lexington, Kentucky that has been open for , seen the beginning of racially-desegregated education in the city, and been overseen by eight principals.

History
Founded in 1939 to replace Picadome High School, Lafayette High School was built on the grounds of a former orphanage with funding from the Works Progress Administration.  The school was named for Gilbert du Motier, Marquis de Lafayette; the French general's family gave the school permission to use their family coat of arms as a logo.  The school shared its property with a mansion—The Elms—until the latter burned down a few months into the first school year.  In 1955, Lafayette was the first white school in Lexington to be racially integrated when Helen Caise Wade (a student at Lexington's all-black Douglass High School) took a summer school course in US history.

Dwight Price (born ) was principal from 1972–87.  After its comprehensive 1998 building renovation, Lafayette implemented block scheduling beginning with the 2000–01 academic year.  In 2012, the school received its eighth principal: Memphis, Tennessee-native and University of Kentucky graduate Bryne Jacobs (born ).  Jacobs previously worked at Lexington's Paul Laurence Dunbar High School from 2000–12, and was still at Lafayette through at least the 2017–18 academic year.  Renovation of the school's stadium was completed in 2010.  The Lexington Herald-Leader reported in July 2022 that Anthony Orr, previously a superintendent of two Kentucky school districts, was the new Lafayette principal.

Part of the Fayette County Public Schools school district, Lafayette had 2271 enrolled students across grades 9–12 in the 2018–19 academic year (628 freshmen, 604 sophomores, 548 juniors, and 489 seniors).  With 118.00 full-time equivalent teachers, the student-to-teacher ratio was 19.25:1.  Of the student body, 0.00% were Native American, 5.55% were Asian, 11.89% were black, 10.79% were Hispanic, 0.09% were Pacific Islanders, 68.34% were white, and 3.35% were multiracial.  According to the Kentucky High School Athletic Association, for the 2019–20 academic year, Lafayette had the largest enrollment of any high school in the state, with 2,362 students.

Academics

As of the 2017–18 academic year, Lafayette offered two specialized programs for its students: the School for the Creative and Performing Arts (SCAPA) and the Pre-Engineering Program.  SCAPA was "designed for students who excel in art, ballet, band, contemporary dance, creative writing, drama, piano, strings, and voice", and required an audition to be considered for the program.  The latter offering was a program "designed to provide students with the skills needed to succeed in such mathematically rigorous and technical fields as engineering, architecture, medicine, computer programming, mathematics, biology, chemistry and physics."

Extracurriculars
The Lafayette boys' basketball team won the Sweet Sixteen championship in 1942, 1950, 1953, 1957, 1979, and 2001.  The baseball team won the state championship in 1988, 1989, and 1992.  The Lafayette marching band was awarded The Sudler Shield by the John Philip Sousa Foundation in 1991 and 1998.

Notable alumni

References

1939 establishments in Kentucky
educational institutions established in 1939
public high schools in Kentucky
schools in Lexington, Kentucky